John Eldridge (1917–1962) was a short-lived British film director.

Gaining fame as documentary film maker in the Second World War for the Ministry of Information his topics covered both war and very particularly architecture and urban planning. He appears to have knowledge and/or training in these fields.

Often working with poets he had at least five collaborative projects with Dylan Thomas.

Life
He was born in Folkestone on 26 July 1917.

Around 1950 he joined John Grierson's film unit: Group 3 Productions.

Over and above directing he also did several screenplays, most notably that of Pool of London and Operation Amsterdam.

Plagued by ill-health he died in Brompton Hospital in London on 14 June 1962.

Works
Sea Lights (1938 co-directed with Martin Curtis
Village School (1940) renowned documentary
Story of Michael Flaherty (1940) starring Morton King
S.o.s. (1940) documentary short
War Front (1941) story of a war correspondent on the front starring Bruce Belfrage
Tank Patrol (1941) short film regarding the crew of a Crusader tank trapped behind enemy lines in North Africa
Architects of England (1941) documentary narrated by Alvar Lidell
Wales: Green Mountain, Black Mountain (1942) documentary looking at the historic conflicts between England and Wales scripted by Dylan Thomas
Trinity House (1942) docu-drama about British lighthouses starring John Snagge and Laidman Browne
New Towns for Old (1942) documentary about urban planning scripted by Dylan Thomas
Fuel for Battle (1944) documentary about military supplies scripted by Dylan Thomas
Our Country (1944) docu-drama scripted by Dylan Thomas and starring Burgess Meredith
A Soldier Comes Home (1945), story by Dylan Thomas of a soldier on leave with his family in London, explains why some men must remain in the army, even after the war. Music by Norman Fulton
A City Reborn (1945) documentary regarding the rebuilding of Coventry again scripted by Dylan Thomas
Park Here (1947) documentary looking at bad parking and the use of car parks, scripted by Laurie Lee
North East Corner (1947) documentary looking at fishing and farming in Aberdeenshire narrated by Laurie Lee
Waverley Steps (1948) a docu-drama regarding a day trip to Edinburgh
Three Dawns to Sydney (1949)
Brandy for the Parson (1952) a "remake" of Whisky Galore!
Laxdale Hall (1953) a second "planning film" but feature length regarding relocation of a town due to access problems
Conflict of Wings (1954) filming by Arthur Grant

References

External links

1917 births
1962 deaths
People from Folkestone
British film directors